The UFC (Ultimate Fighting Championship) is an American mixed martial arts promotion company.

UFC may also refer to:

Businesses and organisations
 United Fruit Company, an American corporation that traded in tropical fruit (primarily bananas)
 UFC Group, a Mongolian food and beverage company
 University of Franche-Comté (Université de Franche-Comté), in Besançon, France 
 Federal University of Ceará (Universidade Federal do Ceará), in Ceará, Brazil
 Universities Funding Council, a defunct British funding body
 Union of Forces for Change (Union des Forces du Changement), a Togolese political party
 United Farmers of Canada (1926–1949), a radical farmers organization
 United Free Church of Scotland, a Scottish Presbyterian denomination
 Uniting for Consensus (UfC), multinational opposition to permanent seats at the UN Security Council
 UFC-Que Choisir, a French consumers group

Gaming
Ultimate Fighting Championship (video game), for the Dreamcast, PlayStation and Game Boy Color
EA Sports UFC, a video game for PlayStation 4 and Xbox One

Other uses
UFC (brand), a brand of banana ketchup owned by Nutri-Asia, Inc.
Urinary free cortisol, in medical testing
Urea Formaldehyde Concentrate, a chemical produced by TogliattiAzot

See also